Love You to Death may refer to:
 Love You to Death (band), a Canadian pop punk band
 Love You to Death (album), 2016 album by Tegan and Sara
 Love You to Death (2012 film), a Hindi-language comedy film
 Love You to Death (2019 film), a film that aired on Lifetime
 "Love You to Death", a song by Type O Negative from their album October Rust
 "Love You to Death", a song by Kill Hannah from their album Until There's Nothing Left of Us
 "Love You to Death", a song by Kamelot from their album Ghost Opera
 Love You to Death, an alternative title of the novel Shadowland by Meg Cabot
 Love You to Death, an alternative title for the American TV series 'Til Death Do Us Part in Canada and Australia
 "Love You to Death" (Forever Knight), the final episode of the first season of Forever Knight

See also 
 I Love You to Death, 1990 film